The 2009 Indian general election for Madhya Pradesh polls were held for 29 seats in the state. The major two contenders in the state were Bharatiya Janta Party (BJP) and the Indian National Congress (INC). The BJP was expected to perform well as it had won the assembly elections conducted in the state during November–December 2008.

Voting and Results
Source: Election Commission of India

The Bharatiya Janta Party (BJP) won 16 seats, Indian National Congress (INC)  12 seats whereas the Bahujan Samaj Party won one seat.

List of Elected MPs

References

Indian general elections in Madhya Pradesh
2000s in Madhya Pradesh
M